Arcillera is a small village in the province of Zamora, Spain, close to the border with Portugal.

A Celtic hoard of silver jewellery and denarii dating to approximately 20 BC was found in Arcillera in the early twentieth century. It is now mostly preserved in the collections of the British Museum.

See also
Cordoba Treasure for similar Celtic hoard

References

Municipalities of the Province of Zamora
Celtic art
Prehistoric objects in the British Museum